Red Asphalt is a series of instructional driver's education videos produced by the California Highway Patrol. The films are known for their graphic depictions of fatal car accidents. Horrendously injured and dismembered bodies are shown in the documentary, typically those of negligent drivers. Five volumes in the series have been produced, and some are still shown at some high schools and private driving schools.

The film has been criticized by the Los Angeles Times for its poor acting and being a "joyless ride" of gruesome images and statistics; the paper also called Red Asphalt "the Reefer Madness of driving: Forget trying to reason with teenagers, just scare 'em."

Installments
 1964 Red Asphalt 
 1978 Red Asphalt II 
 1989 Red Asphalt III
 1998 Red Asphalt IV
 2006 Red Asphalt V

See also 
Signal 30

References

External links
 

Red Asphalt (1964) on YouTube
Red Asphalt II (1980) on YouTube
Red Asphalt III (1989) on YouTube
Red Asphalt IV (1998) on YouTube
Red Asphalt V (2006) on YouTube

Film series introduced in 1964
American social guidance and drug education films
California Highway Patrol
Driver's education
American film series
Short film series